Peille is a commune perched on a rock between Monaco and Menton in the Alpes Maritimes department in southeastern France.

It overlooks the River Peillon. Higher still than the village are the ruins of a château dating from the thirteenth century.

Peille includes the quartiers of La Grave de Peille, where the cement works of VICAT is located, Paravieille, Gaudissart, St. Martin de Peille, La Paran, Les Lacs, Colletta Soubrana de la Grava, Colletta Soutrana de la Grava.

Peille borders Blausasc, Peillon, and La Turbie.

It is thought the area was once home to a little-known Ligurian tribe the Oratelli of Peille  Today the village is notable for its narrow streets, small squares, and architecture dating to the Medieval period.  Examples of this architecture include the remnants of the village fortifications, the 14th century courthouse known as the "Palais des Consuls".  On the very edge of the cliff face is a large building known as the "Palais des Lascaris" this too dates from the fourteenth century.  The village has a twelfth-century church in the Romanesque style with ancient frescos decorating its interior.

Population
The inhabitants are called either Peillois or Peillasques.

See also
Communes of the Alpes-Maritimes department

References

External links

Official site 
Official Infos site 

Communes of Alpes-Maritimes
Alpes-Maritimes communes articles needing translation from French Wikipedia